The 2016 season was the 84th in the history of the Pittsburgh Steelers as a professional sports franchise and as a member of the National Football League (NFL). It also marked the 17th season under leadership of general manager Kevin Colbert and the 10th under head coach Mike Tomlin. For the first time since 2004, tight end Heath Miller was not on the opening day roster, as he announced his retirement on February 19, 2016.

After going 4-5 in their first nine games, the Steelers ended their season on a high note, winning all of their last seven. The Steelers were the first team since the 2011 Green Bay Packers to play on both Thanksgiving and Christmas Day. The Steelers won the AFC North for the second time in three years and made the playoffs for the third straight year. The team also improved upon their 10–6 record from 2015. Le'Veon Bell made his career first playoff appearance with the Steelers in the 2016–17 playoffs. The Steelers went on to defeat the Miami Dolphins in the Wild Card round and the Kansas City Chiefs in the Divisional round before losing to the eventual Super Bowl champion New England Patriots 36–17 in the AFC Championship Game. This was the Steelers' first appearance in the AFC Championship Game since the 2010 NFL season. The team ranked 10th in both offense and defense.

This was also the final season under the ownership of Dan Rooney, as he died on April 13, 2017.

Draft

Notes
 The Steelers traded a conditional fifth-round selection (#164 overall) to the Philadelphia Eagles in exchange for cornerback Brandon Boykin – contingent upon Boykin playing 60% of the snaps with the Steelers during the 2015 season.
 The Steelers traded their original sixth-round selection (#201 overall) to the Jacksonville Jaguars in exchange for placekicker Josh Scobee.
 The Steelers acquired a sixth-round compensatory selection (#220 overall) as a result of the departure of Brice McCain during the  free agency period.
 The Steelers acquired an additional seventh-round selection (#229 overall) in a trade that sent punter Brad Wing to the New York Giants.

Undrafted free agents
All undrafted free agents were signed after the 2016 NFL draft concluded on April 30 unless otherwise noted.

Staff

Final roster

Schedule

Preseason
The Steelers' preseason opponents and schedule was announced on April 7. Dates and times were announced on April 14.

Regular season
The Steelers' regular season schedule was announced on April 14. 

Note: Intra-division opponents are in bold text.

Postseason

Game summaries

Regular season

Week 1: at Washington Redskins

The Steelers opened their 2016 season on the road against the Redskins. In the first quarter, the Redskins got on the board jumping out to a 6–0 lead with two field goals kicked by Dustin Hopkins from 31 and 40 yards out. In the second quarter it was all Steelers as they jumped out to leads of 7–6 and 14–6 at halftime when Ben Roethlisberger found Antonio Brown and Eli Rogers on 29-yard and 3-yard touchdown passes. After the break, the Steelers moved ahead 24–6 when Chris Boswell nailed a 46-yard field goal while Roethlisberger found Brown on a 26-yard touchdown pass. The Skins tried to rally later on in the quarter, but could only get away with a 34-yard field goal from Hopkins making the score 24–9. Though in the fourth quarter, they would eventually pull within 8 when Chris Thompson ran for a 1-yard touchdown making the score 24–16. Later on in the quarter, the Steelers sealed the game when DeAngelo Williams ran for two touchdowns from 15 and 6 yards out to make the final score 38–16.

With the win, the Steelers started their season 1–0.

Week 2: vs. Cincinnati Bengals

The Steelers played their first home game of the year against the division rival Bengals in a rematch of the 2015 AFC wild card game. In the first quarter, the Steelers struck first when Ben Roethlisberger found Xavier Grimble on a 20-yard touchdown pass for a 7–0 lead. The Bengals came within 4 later on in the quarter when Mike Nugent kicked a 25-yard field goal for a 7–3 game. In the second quarter, the Steelers increased their lead when Chris Boswell kicked a 49-yard field goal to make it 10–3. The Bengals came within 4 again when Nugent kicked a 33-yard field goal to make it 10–6 at halftime. In the third quarter, the Steelers moved ahead by double digits when Roethlisberger found Jesse James on a 9-yard touchdown pass to make it 17–6. The Bengals reduced the lead when Nugent kicked another field goal from 21 yards out to make it 17–9. In the fourth quarter, the Steelers pulled away as Roethlisberger found De'Angelo Williams on a 4-yard touchdown pass to make it 24–9. Though the Bengals wrapped up the scoring of the game when Andy Dalton found Giovani Bernard on a 25-yard touchdown pass to make the final score 24–16.

With the win, the Steelers started 2–0 for the first time since 2010.

Week 3: at Philadelphia Eagles

The Steelers traveled cross-state to take on the Eagles. The Eagles scored first with a 29-yarder from Caleb Sturgis, then Jordan Matthews scored a touchdown. The Steelers then got their first and only score of the game, followed by another Eagles field goal to make it 13-3 heading into the half. The Eagles then got three straight touchdowns, all scored by a running back. It was 34-3 heading into the fourth quarter, and the score stayed that way for the rest of the game

With this game, the Steelers suffered their first loss of the season, falling to 2-1

Week 4: vs. Kansas City Chiefs

After a horrifying road loss, the Steelers returned home for a Sunday Night duel against the Chiefs. Through the first half, it was all Steelers starting in the first quarter when Ben Roethlisberger found Darrius Heyward-Bey on a 31-yard touchdown pass with a successful two-point conversion to make it 8–0. This was followed up with Roethlisberger finding Antonio Brown on 2 consecutive touchdown passes: from 4 and 38 yards out to make the score 22–0. In the second quarter, they made the halftime score 29–0 when Roethlisberger found Jesse James on a 9-yard touchdown pass. In the third quarter, Markus Wheaton caught a 30-yard touchdown pass from Roethlisberger to make the score 36–0. In the fourth quarter, the Chiefs finally got on the board when Alex Smith found Tyreek Hill on a 10-yard touchdown pass to make it 36–7. Though the Steelers pretty much sealed the game when De'Angelo Williams ran for a 2-yard touchdown to make it 43–7. The Chiefs then wrapped up the scoring of the game when Smith found Travis Kelce on a 3-yard touchdown pass to make the final score 43–14.

With the win, the Steelers improved to 3–1. With the Ravens' loss to the Raiders earlier in the day, they move into a tie at the top of the AFC North.

The Steelers set a franchise record with 22 total points scored in the first quarter. The team also snapped their streak of consecutive games with at least a giveaway.

Roethlisberger who had thrown 6 touchdown passes and 4 interceptions through the first 3 games had thrown 5 touchdown passes and no interceptions in this game alone.

Week 5: vs. New York Jets

The Steelers stayed home for a game against the Jets. In the first quarter, the Jets took an early 3–0 lead when Nick Folk kicked a 30-yard field goal. Later on, the Steelers took the lead when Ben Roethlisberger found Sammie Coates for a 72-yard touchdown pass to make it 7–3. The Jets scored 10 straight points in the second quarter: Folk kicked a 48-yard field goal to come within a point, 7–6. This would be followed by
Ryan Fitzpatrick finding Brandon Marshall on a 15-yard touchdown pass to make it 13–7. The Steelers wrapped up the scoring of the half when Roethlisberger found Jesse James on a 1-yard touchdown pass to make it 14–13 at halftime. In the second half it was all Steelers. Starting in the third quarter, Chris Boswell put the team up by 4 with a 47-yard field goal to make it 17–13. In the fourth quarter, they would score 2 touchdowns: Roethlisberger found Antonio Brown on a 5-yard pass and then Coates on another 5-yard pass to make the score 24–13 and the eventual final score 31–13.

With the win, the Steelers improved to 4–1. With the Ravens' loss to the Redskins, the team is also now in outright first place in the AFC North.

This would be the final game the Steelers would wear their 1934 throwback uniforms.

Week 6: at Miami Dolphins

The Steelers traveled to Miami to take on the Dolphins. In the first quarter, the Dolphins struck first when Andrew Franks kicked a 30-yard field goal for a 3–0 lead. The Steelers got on the board later on in the quarter taking the lead when Darrius Heyward-Bey ran for a 60-yard touchdown (with a successful 2-point conversion) for an 8–3 game. In the second quarter, it was all Dolphins as they closed out the half by first coming within 2 when Franks kicked a 23-yard field goal to make the score 8–6. The Dolphins eventually took the lead back when Franks kicked another 30-yard field goal for a 9–8 game. They would move ahead by a touchdown when Damien Williams ran for one from a yard out to take a 16–8 lead at halftime. In the third quarter, the Dolphins got back to work when Jay Ajayi ran for a 1-yard touchdown to make the score 23–8 for the only score of the period. The Steelers tried to rally when Ben Roethlisberger found Cobi Hamilton on a 23-yard touchdown pass shortening their deficit to 8, 23–15. Though the Steelers' rush defense stalled with less than a minute left in the game and Ajayi ran for a 62-yard touchdown to seal the game with the final score 30–15.

With the loss, the Steelers fell to 4–2. Ben Roethlisberger would be knocked out of the game due to injury in the second quarter. Though he played in the second half.

The Steelers still remained in first place with the Ravens' loss to the Giants.

Week 7: vs. New England Patriots

The Steelers went back home for another showdown with the Patriots. This game is notable for being the very first game that QB Ben Roethlisberger would miss out on against the Patriots. In the first quarter, The Patriots scored first when Tom Brady found James White on a 19-yard touchdown pass for a 7–0 lead for the only score of the period. In the second quarter, they increased their lead when LaGarrette Blount ran for a 3-yard touchdown to make it 14–0. The Steelers got on the board later on in the quarter when Landry Jones found Darrius Heyward-Bey on a 14-yard touchdown pass for a 14–7 game. The Steelers closed out the scoring of the first half when Chris Boswell kicked a 32-yard field goal for a 14–10 game at halftime. In the third quarter, the Steelers went back to work as Boswell kicked another field goal to get his team within 1, 14–13 from 46 yards out. The Pats pulled away later on when Brady found Rob Gronkowski on a 36-yard touchdown pass (with a failed PAT) for a 20–13 game. In the fourth quarter, the Steelers came within 4 again when Boswell made a 44-yard field goal for a 20–16 game. But the Pats sealed the game after Blount ran for a 5-yard touchdown and the eventual final score of 27–16.

With the loss, the Steelers went into their bye week at 4–3. Regardless, due to the Ravens' loss to the Jets, they still remain in first place in the AFC North. The team dropped to 0–1 on the season without Roethlisberger as a starter and their seven-game home winning streak was snapped.

Week 9: at Baltimore Ravens

Coming off of the bye week, the Steelers traveled to Baltimore to take on their division rival Ravens. The game received much hype, including QB Ben Roethlisberger returning from injury. Through the first half it was all Ravens when Joe Flacco found Mike Wallace on a 95-yard touchdown pass to move up 7–0 in the first quarter. This was followed by Justin Tucker's 49-yard field goal in the second to make it 10–0 at halftime. In the third quarter, the Ravens went back to work as Tucker went for a 42-yard field goal to make it 13–0. In the fourth quarter, Chris Moore blocked a punt and returned it 14 yards for a touchdown with a (successful two-point conversion) to make it 21–0. Later on in the game, the Steelers finally got on the board as Roethlisberger found Antonio Brown on a 23-yard touchdown pass making the score 21–7. They wrapped up the scoring later on when Roethlisberger ran for a touchdown himself from 4 yards out making the final score 21–14.

With their third straight loss, the Steelers fell to 4–4 and move into a tie with the Ravens for the lead in the AFC North. The loss was also the Steelers' fourth straight loss to the Ravens as well as the fourth straight year losing to their top division rivals in Baltimore.

Week 10: vs. Dallas Cowboys

The Steelers traveled home to take on the Cowboys. They would draw first blood in the first quarter when Ben Roethlisberger threw a 2-yard touchdown pass to Le'Veon Bell (with a failed 2-point conversion) for a 6–0 lead. The Cowboys got on the board when Dan Bailey kicked a 37-yard field goal for a 6–3 game. The Steelers pulled away as Roethlisberger found Eli Rogers on a 3-yard touchdown pass for a 12–3 game. The Cowboys came within two points as Dak Prescott found Ezekiel Elliott on an 83-yard touchdown pass to make the score 12–10. In the second quarter, the Cowboys took the lead as Bailey kicked a 53-yard field goal for a 13–12 game. The Steelers wrapped up the scoring of the first half when Chris Boswell kicked a 39-yard field goal taking a 15–13 halftime lead. After the break, the Steelers went back to work as Boswell nailed a 25-yard field goal to move ahead by 5, 18–13. The Cowboys then scored on two consecutive drives: Bailey nailed a 46-yard field goal to make the score 18–16, and Prescott found Dez Bryant on a 50-yard touchdown pass to retake the lead 23–18. The Steelers retook the lead in the fourth quarter when Bell ran for a 1-yard touchdown (with a failed two-point conversion) to make the score 24–23. Though the Cowboys pushed back into the lead when Elliott ran for a 14-yard touchdown (with a failed 2-point conversion) to make the score 29–24, the Steelers moved back into the lead with Roethlisberger's 15-yard touchdown pass to Antonio Brown (with a failed two-point conversion) for a 30–29 game. However, the Boys were able to complete the comeback when Elliott ran for a 32-yard touchdown (with a failed two-point conversion) to make the final score 35–30.

With their fourth straight loss, the Steelers fell to 4–5 and second place in the AFC North.

Week 11: at Cleveland Browns

After a tough home game against the Cowboys, the Steelers traveled to Cleveland for Game 1 against the Browns. In the first half, it was all Steelers starting in the first quarter when Chris Boswell made a 32-yard field goal for a 3–0 lead. They would increase their lead in the second quarter when Boswell made a 33-yard field goal followed up by Le'Veon Bell running for a 1-yard touchdown with a successful two-point conversion to make it 6–0 and then 14–0 at halftime. In the third quarter, the Browns finally got on the board as Cody Parkey made a 24-yard field goal to make the score 14–3. The Steelers however pulled away as Boswell kicked a 22-yard field goal making it 17–3. In the fourth quarter, the Browns drew closer as backup QB Josh McCown threw a 14-yard touchdown pass to Gary Barnidge (with a failed PAT) to make the score 17–9. However, later on, the Steelers sealed the game when Javon Hargrave recovered a fumble in the end zone to make the final score 24–9.

With their four-game losing streak coming to a stop, the Steelers improved to 5–5. Also, they move back into a tie on top of the AFC North due to the Ravens' loss to the Cowboys.

The defense—which had only 13 sacks going into this game—managed to get eight in this game alone, as Cody Kessler and Josh McCown each got sacked four times.

Week 12: at Indianapolis Colts
Thanksgiving Day game

After winning over the Browns, the Steelers traveled further west to take on the Colts in a rematch of 2015's 45–10 blowout win. The Steelers struck first in the first quarter when Le'Veon Bell ran for a 5-yard touchdown to take a 7–0 lead. This would be followed by Ben Roethlisberger finding Antonio Brown on a 25-yard touchdown pass later on in the quarter to make it 14–0. The Colts got on the board in the second quarter when QB Scott Tolzien, starting in place of the injured Andrew Luck, found Donte Moncrief on a 5-yard touchdown pass to make it 14–7. However, the Steelers pulled away as Roethlisberger found Brown again this time on a 33-yard touchdown pass for a 21–7 lead at halftime. After a scoreless third quarter, the Steelers sealed the game with the only points in the second half when Roethlisberger found Brown again this time on a 22-yard touchdown pass and the eventual final score of 28–7.

With the win, the Steelers improved to 6–5. Roethlisberger's record as a starter improved to 1–1 on Thanksgiving Day.

Week 13: vs. New York Giants

After two straight road wins, the Steelers returned home for a duel against the Giants. In the first quarter, the Steelers drew first blood when a penalty was called on Ereck Flowers giving them a safety and a 2–0 lead. They would increase their lead later on when Randy Bullock kicked a 44-yard field goal to make it 5–0. In the second quarter, they pulled further ahead when Ben Roethlisberger found Antonio Brown on a 22-yard touchdown pass (with a failed two-point conversion) to make the score 11–0. Bullock put up a 38-yard field goal to make it 14–0 at halftime. In the third quarter, the Giants finally got on the board when Eli Manning found Rashad Jennings on a 13-yard touchdown pass to make it 14–7. Though the Steelers pulled away when Roethlisberger found Ladarius Green on a 20-yard touchdown pass to make it 21–7. They would increase their lead in the fourth quarter when Bullock put up a 38-yard field goal for a 24–7 game. The Giants then wrapped the scoring of the game up when Manning found Sterling Shepard on a 1-yard touchdown pass to make the final score 24–14.

With their third straight win, the Steelers improved to 7–5. Roethlisberger's record against Manning also improved to 3–1. They have now recorded at least one victory at Heinz Field against each of the 31 other franchises.

Week 14: at Buffalo Bills

The Steelers traveled to Orchard Park, NY to take on the Bills. They struck first in the first quarter when Le'Veon Bell ran for a 3-yard touchdown to make the score 7–0 for the only score of the period. They increased their lead in the second quarter when Bell ran for a 7-yard touchdown to make the score 14–0. The Bills got on the board when Tyrod Taylor found Sammy Watkins on an 8-yard touchdown pass to make it 14–7 at halftime. In the third quarter, the Steelers moved ahead by double digits again when Bell ran for his third touchdown of the game from 5 yards out to make the score 21–7. In the fourth quarter, they increased their lead when Chris Boswell nailed a 37-yard field goal to make the score 24–7. The Bills drew closer when Taylor found Charles Clay on a 40-yard touchdown pass (with a failed PAT) to make the score 24–13. Though the Steelers moved ahead by two touchdowns again when Boswell kicked another field goal from 39 yards out to make it 27–13. The Bills wrapped up the scoring of the game when LeSean McCoy ran for a 3-yard touchdown and the final score of 27–20.

With their fourth straight win, the Steelers improved to 8–5.

Week 15: at Cincinnati Bengals

After a hard-fought road game, the Steelers traveled to Cincinnati to take on the Bengals. The Bengals started off the scoring in the first quarter when Randy Bullock kicked a 23-yard field goal for a 3–0 lead. The Steelers tied it up when Chris Boswell nailed a 45-yard field goal, leaving the score at 3–3, but the Bengals regained the lead late in the first quarter on Andy Dalton's 1-yard touchdown run to make the score 10–3. In the second quarter, the Bengals moved up by double digits as Jeremy Hill ran for a 4-yard touchdown to make it 17–3. The Steelers drew closer as Boswell made another field goal to make it 17–6, but Bullock put the Bengals back up by two touchdowns with a 23-yard field goal to make it 20–6. The Steelers closed the first half out with their third field goal of the game, as Boswell kicked a 49-yard effort to make the halftime score 20–9. Those three points would be the first three of 15 straight as they would shut out the Bengals in the second half, starting with field goals from 40 and 49 yards out to reduce the deficit to 20–15. In the fourth quarter, the Steelers moved even closer when Boswell kicked his sixth field goal of the game from 30 yards out to make it 20–18. They completed the comeback attempt when Ben Roethlisberger found Eli Rogers on a 24-yard touchdown pass with 7:29 remaining; however, the two-point conversion was unsuccessful, which made the score 24–20, which would end up being the final score.

With the win, the Steelers improved to 9–5. The team also won five games in a row for the first time since 2009. The Steelers finished the season 5–3 away from home.

Week 16: vs. Baltimore Ravens
NFL on Christmas Day

After two straight road wins, the Steelers returned home for their second game of the season against the Ravens. The Steelers scored first in the first quarter when Ben Roethlisberger found Xavier Grimble on a 20-yard touchdown pass and a 7–0 lead. The Ravens closed out the first quarter with a Justin Tucker field goal from 41 yards out for a 7–3 lead. In the second quarter, Tucker kicked another field goal this one from 38 yards out to make the halftime score 7–6. In the third quarter, the Ravens moved into the lead when Joe Flacco found Steve Smith Sr. on an 18-yard touchdown pass with a successful two-point conversion to make it 14–7. The Steelers drew closer when Chris Boswell made a 36-yard field goal to make it 14–10. Though the Ravens moved back ahead by a touchdown when Tucker kicked a 46-yard field goal to make it 17–10. In the fourth quarter, Tucker kicked a 23-yard field goal to send the Ravens up by double digits and make the score 20–10. The Steelers eventually retook the lead with 2 straight touchdowns: Le'Veon Bell ran for one from 7-yards out followed by Roethlisberger finding Bell on a 7-yard pass to take the score to 24–20. The Ravens retook the lead when Kyle Juszczyk ran for a 10-yard touchdown to make it 27–24. However, the Steelers completed the comeback when Roethlisberger found Antonio Brown on a 4-yard pass to make the final score 31–27.

With their four-game losing streak against the Ravens snapped, the Steelers improved to 10–5 and were awarded the AFC North division title. The team also won six games in a row for the first time since 2004.

Brown's game-winning touchdown was dubbed the Immaculate Extension as he had to extend the ball over the goal line after being stood up at the one-yard line.

Week 17: vs. Cleveland Browns

After a tough win, the Steelers stayed home for the last regular season game which would turn out to be Round 2 against the Browns. The Browns struck first in the first quarter when Seth DeValve ran for a 12-yard touchdown to make it 7–0 for the only score of the period. They made it 14–0 in the second quarter when RG3 found Gary Barnidge on a 4-yard pass. The Steelers got on the board when backup QB Landry Jones found De'Angelo Williams on an 11-yard pass to make it 14–7 at halftime. After a scoreless third quarter, the Steelers continued their reign of scoring unanswered points in the fourth when Williams ran for a 1-yard touchdown to tie the game at 14–14 before taking the lead when Jones found Demarcus Ayers on an 11-yard pass to make it 21–14. Though, the Browns would close out regulation, tying the game at 21–21 when George Atkinson III ran for a 5-yard touchdown. In overtime, the Browns retook the lead when Cody Parkey nailed a 34-yard field goal to make it 24–21. The Steelers would eventually score the game-winning touchdown when Jones found Cobi Hamilton on a 26-yard pass to make the final score 27–24.

With the win, the Steelers finished their season 11–5. The team also won seven games in a row for the first time since 2004 and finished the season 6-2 at home.

Postseason

AFC Wild Card Playoffs: vs. (6) Miami Dolphins

The Steelers had wrapped the regular season up with the #3 seed and played against the sixth-seeded Dolphins at home. The Steelers would draw first blood with Ben Roethlisberger finding Antonio Brown on 2 consecutive touchdown passes: from 50 and 62 yards out to make the score 14–0. The Dolphins got on the board later on when Andrew Franks kicked a 40-yard field goal to make it 14–3. In the second quarter, the Steelers made the score 20–3 when Le'Veon Bell ran for a 1-yard touchdown, although Chris Boswell missed his first extra point attempt of the season. The Dolphins closed out the first half when Franks kicked a 47-yard field goal to make it 20–6. In the second half, the Steelers scored twice when Boswell nailed a 34-yard field goal to make it 23–6. Bell then ran for an 8-yard touchdown to make it 30–6. In the fourth quarter, the Dolphins wrapped the scoring of the game up when Matt Moore, who was filling in for the injured Ryan Tannehill found Damien Williams on a 4-yard pass (with a failed two-point conversion) to make the final score 30–12.

AFC Divisional Playoffs: at (2) Kansas City Chiefs

After blowing out the Dolphins at home, the Steelers traveled to Kansas City to take on the Chiefs.  The Steelers scored first in the first quarter when Chris Boswell kicked a 22-yard field goal for a 3-0 lead.  The Chiefs moved into the lead when Alex Smith found Albert Wilson on a 5-yard touchdown pass to make it 7-3.  The Steelers came within a point when Boswell kicked a 38-yard field goal to make it 7-6.  In the second quarter, it was all Steelers when Boswell kicked 2 more field goals:  from 36 and 45 yards out retaking the lead and changing the score from 9-7 to 12-7 at halftime.  In the third quarter, the Steelers moved further ahead with another field goal by Boswell from 43 yards out to make it 15-7.  The Chiefs then moved closer later on in the quarter when Cairo Santos kicked a 48-yard field goal to make it 15-10.  In the fourth quarter, Boswell kicked another 43 yard field goal to move ahead 18-10.  The Chiefs tried to rally but came up short when Spencer Ware ran for a 1-yard touchdown (with a failed 2-point conversion) sealing the win for the Steelers.

With the win, the team improved to 13-5 overall.  They are also the first team since the 2006 Colts to win a playoff game without scoring a single touchdown.

Boswell's six field goals became an NFL playoff record for the most in a single game.

AFC Championship: at (2) New England Patriots

After a tough road win, the Steelers traveled further east to take on the top-seeded Patriots in the AFC Championship Game. The Pats drew first blood when Stephen Gostkowski kicked a 31-yard field goal for a 3-0 lead.  This would be followed up by Tom Brady finding Chris Hogan on a 16-yard pass to make it 10-0.  In the second quarter, the Steelers got on the board when DeAngelo Williams ran for a touchdown from 5 yards out (with a failed PAT) for a 10-6.  The Pats pulled away as Brady and Hogan hooked up again on a 34-yard pass to make it 17-6.  The Steelers closed out the
half when Chris Boswell nailed a 23-yard field goal to make the halftime score 17-9.  In the third quarter, the Pats went back to work as Gostowski kicked a 47-yard field goal to send his team up by double digits again, 20-9.  LaGarrette Blount ran up the middle for a 1-yard touchdown to make it 27-9.  Brady later on found Julian Edelman on a 10-yard pass (with a failed PAT) to make it 33-9.  In the fourth quarter, the Pats moved even further ahead when Gostkowski kicked a 26-yard field goal to make it 36-9.  The Steelers then wrapped the scoring of the game up when Ben Roethlisberger found Cobi Hamilton on a 30-yard pass with a successful 2-point conversion to make the final score 36-17.

With the loss, the Steelers ended their season 13-6.  Roethlisberger dropped to 3-2 in Conference Championship games.

Standings

Division

Conference

Transactions
The Steelers have been involved in the following transactions during the 2016 season:

Trades

Free agents

Waivers

Signings

Cuts

Other

References

External links

 2016 Pittsburgh Steelers season at Pro Football Reference 
 2016 Pittsburgh Steelers season statistics at jt-sw.com 

Pittsburgh
Pittsburgh Steelers seasons
Pittsburgh Steelers
AFC North championship seasons
2010s in Pittsburgh